Lluís Dalmau was a valencian 15th-century painter who flourished between 1431 and 1460. He was active in Barcelona from 1428 to 1460 and served the king of Spain in an official capacity. In 1431, King Alfonso V sent him to Flanders to learn the language of realist painting. He made a copy of the Adoration of the Lamb by Hubert and Jan van Eyck; in 1432, this was placed in St Bavo's Cathedral, Ghent. The next year, he had returned to Barcelona. In 1443, Dalmau was commissioned to paint the Virgin of the Consellers altarpiece for the chapel of the City Hall, which he completed in 1445; this is perhaps the only known work of his to survive. In 1445, he also painted a Virgin and Child in the style of Jan van Eyck, which is in the church of San Miguel at Barcelona.

References

 

Year of birth unknown
Year of death unknown
Painters from Catalonia
15th-century Spanish painters
Spanish male painters
15th-century Spanish people
Catholic painters